In sailing, a block is a single or multiple pulley.  One or a number of sheaves are enclosed in an assembly between cheeks or chocks.  In use, a block is fixed to the end of a line, to a spar, or to a surface. A line (rope) is reeved through the sheaves, and maybe through one or more matching blocks at some far end, to make up a tackle.

The purchase of a tackle refers to its mechanical advantage. In general the more sheaves in the blocks that make up a tackle, the higher its mechanical advantage.  The matter is slightly complicated by the fact that every tackle has a working end where the final run of rope leaves the last sheave. More mechanical advantage can be obtained if this end is attached to the moving load rather than the fixed end of the tackle.

There are various types of blocks that are used in sailing. Some blocks are used to increase mechanical advantage and others are used simply to change the direction of a line. A ratchet block turns freely when a line is pulled in one direction but does not turn the other direction, although the line may slip past the sheave. This kind of block makes a loaded line easier to hold by hand, and is sometimes used on smaller boats for lines like main and jib sheets that are frequently adjusted.

A single, large, sail-powered warship in the mid-19th century required more than 1,400 blocks of various kinds.

Sailing terms in everyday English
 Chock a' block  Refers literally to the situation where pulling on the working line will not raise the load any further because the cheeks of one lifting block are already against the other.  Figuratively this has come to mean that something is as full or as close as it can be.

See also

 Block and tackle
 Two six heave
 Portsmouth Block Mills
 Pulley

References

Sailing rigs and rigging